The Olivetti M19 was a personal computer made in 1986 by the Italian company Olivetti. It has an 8088 at 4.77 or 8 MHz and 256–640 KB of RAM. The BIOS is Revision Diagnostics 3.71. In the UK, it was sold by Acorn Computers as the Acorn M19, with additional software also available via Acorn. In France, it was available as the Persona 1300, sold by LogAbax.

Specifications 
The machine came with three operating systems: MS-DOS 2.11 / 3.1, Concurrent DOS and UCSD p-System. It was capable of displaying graphics in standard CGA or Plantronics Colorplus mode (320x200 pixel with 16 colors and 640x200 with 4 colors).

The M19 was sold with two floppy disk drives (360 KB format). A hard drive option was made available later, in the form of a 5 MB (later 10 MB) hard disk in an add-on case (aka "sidecar") attached to the left hand side of the computer by four machine screws.

Paul Maynes, a technician at HBH Computers (one of Olivetti's dealerships in Durban) designed, and SA Signals Manufacturing (also of Durban) produced a bus extension card with a 90-degree bend (purportedly a world-first) that could accommodate a Seagate hard drive controller card. This allowed the second floppy drive to be removed and a 20 MB (later 40 MB) full-height hard drive installed in its place.

M19 based word processors 
In 1987 Olivetti introduced the word processor systems ETV 260 and ETV 500 based on the M19. While the ETV 500 was just a M19 accelerated to 8 MHz and equipped with two 3.5 inch 720 kB floppy drives, which used optionally an Olivetti ET series typewriter (usually a ET 112 or ET 116) as a serial attached keyboard and daisy wheel printer, the ETV 260 was a fully integrated word processor system with the M19 / ETV 500 accelerated mainboard mounted into a high speed 35 cps daisy wheel typewriter chassis, equipped with two 720 kB floppy drives or a single floppy drives plus an integrated 20 MB SCSI or MFM hard disk. 

Both systems, ETV 260 and ETV, 500 ran MS-DOS 3 and booted directly into Olivetti's own word processor software SWS - Secretary's Work Station, which could be easy used by people already familiar with Olivetti's ET series typewriters and older CP/M based ETV word processor systems (like the ETV 240, 250 or 350).

Gallery

See also 
 Olivetti M24
 Olivetti video typewriters
 Plantronics Colorplus

References

External links
Product brochure (in German)
Product brochure (in Italian)
 "Total Hardware 1999 - Jumper settings for 14876 devices - Motherboards. 8088, 8086, 80188, V20 - OLIVETTI M19". Colorado Custom Software Applications.

M19 based Olivetti ETV 260 completely disassembled

Olivetti personal computers
Computer-related introductions in 1986